Nicholas F. Usher  (born January 22, 1995) is a professional Canadian football defensive lineman for the Montreal Alouettes of the Canadian Football League (CFL).

University career 
Usher played college football for the UTEP Miners from 2013 to 2016. He spent the first three seasons as a defensive lineman before moving to linebacker in his senior year.

Professional career

Seattle Seahawks 
After not being selected in the 2017 NFL Draft, Usher signed with the Seattle Seahawks as an undrafted free agent on May 12, 2017. However, he was released before the start of preseason on July 29, 2017.

New England Patriots 
On August 28, 2017, Usher signed with the New England Patriots. He played in one pre-season game and was released with the final training camp cuts that year.

Edmonton Eskimos 
On October 4, 2017, Usher signed a practice roster agreement with the Edmonton Eskimos and later a futures contract for the 2018 season. He played in his first professional game on July 13, 2018, against the Toronto Argonauts where he recorded three defensive tackles. That year, he played in eight regular season games where he had seven defensive tackles, three special teams tackles, one sack, and one forced fumble.

In 2019, Usher played in all 18 regular season games where he had 36 defensive tackles, six sacks, and three forced fumbles. He also played in his first career post-season games, in the East Semi-Final and East Final, the latter of which the Eskimos lost to the Hamilton Tiger-Cats. He was granted an early release on January 2, 2020, in order to sign with a National Football League team.

Las Vegas Raiders 
Usher signed with the Las Vegas Raiders in January 2020, but was waived during training camp with an injury designation on August 24, 2020.

Montreal Alouettes 
On February 9, 2021, it was announced that Usher had signed with the Montreal Alouettes. In a pandemic-shortened 2021 season, Usher played in all 14 regular season games where he had 35 defensive tackles, five sacks, and one forced fumble.

Usher signed a two-year contract extension with the Alouettes on January 24, 2022.

Personal life 
Usher was born in Los Angeles, California, to parents Norman and Geraldine Usher. He has one brother and one sister.

References

External links 
Montreal Alouettes bio 

1995 births
Living people
American football defensive linemen
American players of Canadian football
Canadian football defensive linemen
Edmonton Elks players
Las Vegas Raiders players
Montreal Alouettes players
New England Patriots players
Players of American football from Los Angeles
Players of Canadian football from Los Angeles
Seattle Seahawks players
UTEP Miners football players